A by-election for the seat of Dalhousie in the Victorian Legislative Assembly was held on Thursday 31 January 1924. The by-election was triggered by the death of Nationalist member Allan Cameron on 28 December 1923.

The Dalhousie by-election was the first to be held under the provisions of the Amending Electoral Act passed by the Victorian Parliament in December 1923, after a perceived abuse of electoral laws during the Daylesford by-election in August. Among other clauses, the new legislation required "authorised witnesses" to confirm the identity of electors applying for a postal vote.

Candidates
Four nominations were received by noon on 18 January 1924. The candidates were Reg Pollard, a farmer and grazier from Woodend, for the Labor Party; Angus Stewart McNab, a farmer and grazier from Willowmavin, for the Nationalist Party; Gerald James McKenna, a farmer from Kyneton, for the Country Party; and John James McCarthy, a grazier from Kyneton, an independent candidate.

Results

References

1924 elections in Australia
Victorian state by-elections
1920s in Victoria (Australia)